Nukri Manchkhava (born 5 January 1982 in Tbilisi) is a retired Georgian footballer.

External links
 
 

1982 births
Living people
Footballers from Tbilisi
Footballers from Georgia (country)
Expatriate footballers from Georgia (country)
Expatriate footballers in Belarus
Expatriate footballers in Lithuania
Association football midfielders
FC Guria Lanchkhuti players
FC Lokomotivi Tbilisi players
FC Dinamo Tbilisi players
FBK Kaunas footballers
FC Torpedo-BelAZ Zhodino players
FC Dinamo Batumi players
FC Spartaki Tskhinvali players
FC Torpedo Kutaisi players